This is a list of musical compositions for violin and orchestra.  See entries for concerto and violin concerto for a description of related musical forms.

Concertos

A

Jean-Baptiste Accolay
Violin Concerto No. 1 (1868)
Violin Concerto No. 2 (1895)
Violin Concerto No. 3 (1899)
Joseph Achron
Violin Concerto No. 1 (1927)
Lee Actor
Concerto for Violin and Orchestra (2005)
Marina Adamia
Concerto for violin and symphony orchestra (1983)
John Adams
Violin Concerto (1993)
Dharma at Big Sur (2003)
Thomas Adès
Concentric Paths, Concerto for Violin and Orchestra (2005)
Lejla Agolli
Violin concerto No.1
Violin concerto No.2
Miguel del Águila
Violin Concerto (2008)
Kalevi Aho
Violin Concerto No.1 (1981)
Violin Concert No. 2 (2015)
Necil Kazım Akses
Violin Concerto (1972)
Eleanor Alberga 
Violin concerto No.1 (2001)
Mark Alburger
Violin Concerto ("Ticklish"), Op. 87 (2000)
Luna Alcalay
Sentenzen (1996)
Maria de Alvear
Hilos de oro, for voice, violin and orchestra (1991)
Agua dulce, for oboe, violin and orchestra (1994)
William Alwyn
Violin Concerto (1939)
Hendrik Andriessen
Violin Concerto (1969)
Jurriaan Andriessen
Violin Concerto (1992)
Caroline Ansink
Concerto for violin and orchestra (1986)
George Antheil
Concerto for Violin and Orchestra (1946)
Malcolm Arnold
Concerto for two violins and string orchestra. Op. 77
Violet Archer
Concerto for violin and orchestra (1959)
Claude Arrieu (Louise-Marie Simon)
Violin concerto No.1 in E minor (1938)
Violin concerto No.2 in D minor (1949)
Clarice Assad
Violin Concerto (2004) 
Kurt Atterberg
Violin Concerto (1914)
Lera Auerbach
Violin Concerto No. 1 (2003)
Violin Concerto No. 2 (2004)
"De Profundis" Violin Concerto No. 3 (2015)
"The Infant Minstrel and His Peculiar Menagerie" for Violin, Choir and Orchestra (2016)
Lydia Auster
Lyrical concertino "Summer in Käsmu", op. 25 (1966)
Tor Aulin
 Violin Concerto No. 1 in G minor (1891)
 Violin Concerto No. 2 (1893)
 Violin Concerto No. 3 in C minor (1906)

B
Grażyna Bacewicz
Seven violin concertos (1937–1965)
Johann Sebastian Bach
Violin Concerto in A minor, BWV 1041 (1717–1723)
Violin Concerto in E major, BWV 1042 (1717–1723)
Double Violin Concerto in D minor, BWV 1043 (1723)
Henk Badings
Violin Concerto No. 1 (1928)
Violin Concerto No. 2 (1935)
Violin Concerto No. 3 (1944)
Violin Concerto No. 4 (1947)
Double Violin Concerto No. 1 (1954)
Double Violin Concerto No. 2 (1969)
Leonardo Balada
Violin Concerto No. 1 (1982)
Osvaldas Balakauskas
Concerto RK (1997)
Concerto Brio (1999)
Samuel Barber
Violin Concerto, Op. 14 (1939)
Sergei Barsukov
Violin Concerto No. 2 (1962)
Wolfgang von Bartels
Violin concerto op.17 (1927)
Ethel Barns
Violin Concerto in A Major (1904)
Béla Bartók
Violin Concerto No. 1 (1908)
Violin Concerto No. 2 (1938)
Mason Bates
Violin Concerto (2012)
Anton Bauer
Violin concerto (1921)
Arnold Bax
Violin Concerto (1937)
Norma Beecroft
Improvvisazioni concertanti No.2, for violin and orchestra
Sally Beamish
Violin Concerto (1994)
Ludwig van Beethoven
Violin Concerto in D major, Op. 61 (1806)
Violin Concerto in C major, WoO 5 (c.1790)
Paul Ben-Haim
Violin Concerto (1960)
Alban Berg
Violin Concerto (1935)
Erik Bergman
Violin Concerto, Op. 99 (1984)
William Bergsma
Violin Concerto (1965)
Luciano Berio
Violin Concerto
Charles de Bériot
Nine violin concertos
Franz Berwald
Violin Concerto in C-sharp minor (1820)
Harrison Birtwistle
Concerto for Violin and Orchestra (2009-10)
Daniel Bjarnason
Violin Concerto (2017)
Bruno Bjelinski
Violin Concerto (1952)
Boris Blacher
Violin Concerto (1948)
Ernest Bloch
Violin Concerto in A minor (1938)
Sylvie Bodorova
Concerto for violin and orchestra "Messagio" (1989)
Karl Boelter
Violin Concerto (1999)
Rob du Bois
Concerto for violin and orchestra (1975)
Concerto for two violins and orchestra (1979)
Corentin Boissier
"The Intemporal", concert(in)o for violin and (chamber) orchestra in D minor (2010)
Paul Gregory Bonneau
Violin concerto 'American Dream: I Wanto to Rule the World' (2005)
Nimrod Borenstein
Concerto for Violin and Orchestra Op. 60 (2013)
Hakon Børresen
Violin Concerto in G major, Op. 11 (1904)
Henriette Bosmans
Concertstuk, for violin and orchestra (1934)
Grave funebre, for violin and orchestra
Violin caprices 5 & 8, for violin and orchestra
Susan Botti
Within darkness, for violin and chamber orchestra (2000)
Hendrik Bouman
Violin Concerto in D major for Simon Standage (2008)(site)
Brian Boydell
Violin Concerto, Op. 36 (1953–54)
Ina Boyle
Concerto for violin and orchestra (1932-33 rev. 1935)
Fantasy for violin and chamber orchestra (1926)
Desmond Bradley
Violin concerto (1969)
Johannes Brahms 
Violin Concerto in D major, Op. 77 (1878)
Matija Bravničar
Violin Concerto (1962)
Johannes Bernardus van Bree
Violin Concerto 
Therese Brenet
Odi et amo, for violin and orchestra (1992)
Poeme, for violin and orchestra (1994)
Seuls tes yeux demeurerent, for violin and orchestra (2000)
Havergal Brian
Violin Concerto No. 2 in C major (no. 1 lost) (1934–5)
Benjamin Britten
Violin Concerto, Op. 15 (1939, rev. 1954, 1965)
Mikhail Bronner
Violin Concerto 'Lonely Voice' (1992)
Violin Concerto 'Heaven's Gate' (2001)
Stephen Brown 
Violin Concerto 'The Ouroboros' (2017)
Max Bruch
Violin Concerto No. 1 in G minor, Op. 26 (1867)
Violin Concerto No. 2 in D minor, Op. 44 (1878)
Violin Concerto No. 3 in D minor, Op. 58 (1891)
Joanna Bruzdowicz
Concerto for violin and orchestra No.1 (1975)
Hermann Buchal
Violin concerto op.69 (1941)
Hans Bullerian
Violin concerto op.7
Willy Burkhard
Violin Concerto, Op. 69 (1943)
Britta Bystrom
Lyckans land, for violin and orchestra (2006)

C
Édith Canat de Chizy
Concerto for violin and orchestra "Exultet" (1995)
Elliott Carter
Violin Concerto (1990)
Mario Castelnuovo-Tedesco
Concerto Italiano (1924)
Violin Concerto No. 2 (1931)
Carlos Chávez
Violin Concerto (1950)
Qigang Chen
La joie de la souffrance for Violin and Orchestra (2017)
Gordon Chin
 Violin Concerto No. 1(1998)
 Formosa Seasons for Violin and Strings (2001) 
 Concerto for Violin, Cello, and Orchestra (2002)
 Violin Concerto No. 2 (2003)
Unsuk Chin
 Violin Concerto (2002)
Samuel Coleridge-Taylor
 Violin Concerto Op.80 (1912)
Julius Conus
 Violin Concerto in E minor (1898)
Gloria Coates
Holographic universe, for violin and orchestra (1975)
Roque Cordero
Violin Concerto (1962)
Guirne Creith (born Gladys Mary Cohen)
Concerto in G minor for violin and orchestra (1934)
Paul Creston
 Violin Concerto No. 1, Op. 65 (1956) Concerto for violin & orchestra, op. 65 Lydian ode, for orchestra, op. 67. Concerto for accordion, op. 75. 
 Violin Concerto No. 2, Op. 78 (1960)
Zulema de la Cruz
Concerto for violin and chamber orchestra No.1 "Pacifico" (2006)

D
Michael Daugherty
Fire and Blood, concerto for violin and orchestra (2003)
Fallingwater, concerto for violin and string orchestra (2013)
Peter Maxwell Davies
Violin Concerto (1985)
Violin Concerto No.2 Fiddler on the Shore (2009)
Frederick Delius
Violin Concerto (1916)
Yvonn Desportes
Caprice champetre, for violin and orchestra (1955)
David Diamond
Violin Concerto No. 1 (1937)
Violin Concerto No. 2 (1947)
Violin Concerto No. 3 (1976)
Mary Dickenson-Auner
Irish concerto for violin and orchestra
Concerto for violin and orchestra No.2
Albert Dietrich
Violin Concerto in D minor, Op. 30
Charles Dieupart
Concerto in A major for violin, 2 oboes, bassoon, strings, and basso continuo
Concerto in B major for 2 violins, 2 oboes, bassoon, strings, and basso continuo
James Dillon
Violin Concerto (2000)
Ernő Dohnányi
Violin Concerto No. 1 in D minor, Op. 27 (1915)
Violin Concerto No. 2 in C minor, Op. 43 (1949–50)
Zsolt Durkó
Violin Concerto
Pascal Dusapin
Quad, 'In memoriam Gilles Deleuze', for violin and 15 musicians (1996)
Aufgang, violin concerto (2008-2011)
Henri Dutilleux
L'arbre des songes – Violin Concerto (1985)
Sur un même accord – Nocturne for Violin and Orchestra (2002)
Antonín Dvořák
Violin Concerto in A minor, Op. 53 (1879–80)

E
Sophie Carmen Eckhardt-Gramatté
Violin Concerto for Solo Violin
Danny Elfman
Concerto for Violin and Orchestra "Eleven Eleven" (2016-2017)
Edward Elgar
Violin Concerto in B minor, Op. 61 (1910)
Anders Eliasson
Violin Concerto Solitary Journey (2011; premiered by Ulf Wallin)
 Federico Elizalde
 Violin Concerto (1944; premiered by Ginette Neveu)
Jose Elizondo
La alborada de la esperanza (The Dawn of Hope) (2018)
Limoncello (2018)
Crepúsculos (Twilights) (2018)
Heino Eller
Violin Concerto (1933, rev. 1965)
Einar Englund
Violin Concerto (1981)
Iván Erőd
Violin Concerto op. 15 (1973)

F
Sebastian Fagerlund
Violin Concerto Darkness in Light
Johann Friedrich Fasch
Violin Concerto in A major, Fwv L:A 1
Violin Concerto in A major, Fwv L:A 2
Violin Concerto in A major, Fwv L:A 3 
Violin Concerto in A minor, Fwv L:a 2
Violin Concerto in B major, Fwv L:B 2
Violin Concerto in D major, Fwv L:D 2
Violin Concerto in D major, Fwv L:D 3
Violin Concerto in D major, Fwv L:D 4
Violin Concerto in D major, Fwv L:D 4a
Violin Concerto in D major, Fwv L:D 5
Violin Concerto in D major, Fwv L:D 6
Violin Concerto in D major. Fwv L:D 7
Violin Concerto in D major, Fwv L:D 8
Violin Concerto in F major, Fwv L:F 2
Concerto for violin, 2 flutes, 2 oboes, bassoon, strings, continuo in G major, Fwv L:G 4
Violin Concerto in G major, Fwv L:G 5
Violin Concerto in G major, Fwv L:G 6
Violin Concerto in G major, Fwv L:G 7 
Gabriel Fauré
Violin Concerto [unfinished] (1878–80); two of three movements were completed, the first survives
Morton Feldman
Violin and Orchestra (1979)
Jacobo Ficher
Concerto for violin and orchestra, Op. 46 (1942)
Josef Bohuslav Foerster
Violin Concerto No. 1 in C minor, Op. 88 (1911)
Violin Concerto No. 2 in D minor, Op. 104
Wolfgang Fortner
Concerto for Violin and Large Chamber Orchestra (1947)
Eduard Franck
Violin Concerto No. 1 in E minor, Op. 30 (1855/1861, printed 1890)
Violin Concerto No. 2 in D major, Op. 57 (1875)
Konzertstück for Violin and Orchestra in A major (1845)
Richard Franck
Violin Concerto in D major, Op. 43 (1906)
Serenade for Violin and Orchestra in A major, Op. 25 (1896)
Benjamin Frankel
Violin Concerto (1951)
Peter Fribbins
Concerto for Violin and Orchestra (2014–15)

G
Niels Gade
Violin Concerto in D minor, Op. 56 (1880)
Blas Galindo
Violin Concerto (1962)
Raymond Gallois-Montbrun
Violin Concerto (1957)
Chen Gang and He Zhanhao
 Butterfly Lovers' Violin Concerto
Philippe Gaubert
Violin Concerto in B-flat Major  (1929)
Harald Genzmer
Concerto for Violin (1959)
Roberto Gerhard
Violin Concerto (1945, rev. 1950)
Friedrich Gernsheim
Violin Concerto No. 1 in D major, Op. 42
Violin Concerto No. 2 in F major, Op. 86
Alberto Ginastera
Violin Concerto (1963)
Philip Glass
Violin Concerto No. 1 (1987)
Violin Concerto No. 2 (2009)
Alexander Glazunov
Violin Concerto in A minor, Op. 82 (1904)
Benjamin Godard
Concerto Romantique, Op.35
Concerto No.2, Op.131
Hermann Goetz
Violin Concerto in G major, Op. 22
Karel Goeyvaerts
Violin Concerto No. 1 (1948)
Violin Concerto No. 2 (1951)
Karl Goldmark
Violin Concerto No. 1 in A minor, Op. 28 (1877)
Violin Concerto No. 2 ?
Berthold Goldschmidt
Violin Concerto (1952/55)
Evgeny Golubev
Violin Concerto, Op. 56 (1970)
Paul Graener
Violin Concerto, Op.104 (1938)
Kurt Graunke
Violin Concerto (1959)
Camargo Guarnieri
Violin Concerto No. 1 (1940)
Violin Concerto No. 2 (1952)
Sofia Gubaidulina
Offertorium, concerto for violin and orchestra (1980–86)
In tempus praesens, concerto for violin and orchestra (2006–07)
César Guerra-Peixe
Concertino for violin and chamber orchestra (1972)

H
Reynaldo Hahn
Violin Concerto in D major (1928)
Alexei Haieff
Violin Concerto (1948)
Johann David Heinichen
Violin Concerto in D major, S.224
Cristóbal Halffter
Violin Concerto No. 1 (1979)
Violin Concerto No. 2 (1990–91)
Rodolfo Halffter
Violin Concerto Op. 11 (1940)
Hafliði Hallgrímsson
Poemi, Violin Concerto (1986)
Iain Hamilton
Violin Concerto, Op. 15
Amphion – Concerto No. 2 for violin and orchestra (1971)
Georg Friedrich Händel
Violin Concerto in B flat major, HWV 288 (Sonata à 5)
John Harbison
Violin Concerto (1980/87)
Roy Harris
Violin Concerto (1950)
Lou Harrison
Concerto for Violin with Percussion Orchestra (1940–74)
Karl Amadeus Hartmann
Concerto funebre for violin and string orchestra (1939)
Hamilton Harty
Violin Concerto (1908)
Joseph Haydn
Violin Concerto No. 1 in C major, Hob. VIIa:1 (ca. 1765)
Violin Concerto No. 2 in D major, Hob. VIIa:2 (1765, lost)
Violin Concerto No. 3 in A major, Hob. VIIa:3 "Melker Konzert" (ca. 1770)
Violin Concerto No. 4 in G major, Hob. VIIa:4 (1769)
Hans Henkemans
Violin Concerto (1950)
Hans Werner Henze
Violin Concerto No. 1 (1947)
Violin Concerto No. 2 "Hommage à Gödel" (1971, revised 1991)
Violin Concerto No. 3 "Three Portraits from T. Mann's Doktor Faustus" (1996)
Kenneth Hesketh
Inscription-Transformation for Violin and Orchestra (2015) 
Paul Hindemith
Violin Concerto (1939)
Jennifer Higdon
Violin Concerto (2008)
Edward Burlingame Hill
Violin Concerto
Ferdinand Hiller
Violin Concerto, Op.152a (1871)
Alistair Hinton
Violin Concerto (1979)
Robin Holloway
Violin Concerto, Op. 70 (1990)
Vagn Holmboe
Chamber Concerto No. 6 for Violin (1943)
Violin Concerto (1979?)
Gustav Holst
Double Concerto (1929)
Simon Holt
witness to a snow miracle (2005)
Alan Hovhaness
Concerto No. 2 (Violin Concerto No. 1) for violin and strings, Op. 89, No. 1 (1951; rev. 1957)
Violin Concerto No. 2, Op. 431 (1993)
Jenő Hubay
Violin Concerto No. 1 (Concerto dramatique) in A minor, Op. 21 (1884)
Violin Concerto No. 2 in E major, Op. 90 (1900)
Violin Concerto No. 3 in G minor, Op. 99 (1906–1907)
Violin Concerto No. 4 (Concerto all' antica) in A minor, Op. 101 (1907)

I
Toshi Ichiyanagi
Violin Concerto "Circulating Scenery" (1983)
Shin-ichiro Ikebe
Violin Concerto (1981)
Maki Ishii
Lost Sounds III – Violin Concerto (1978)
Jānis Ivanovs
Violin Concerto (1951)

J
David A. Jaffe
Violin Concerto "How Did It Get So Late So Soon?", for violin and orchestra or chamber orchestra (2016)
Violin Concerto "Bristlecone Concerto", for violin and chamber orchestra (1984)
Double Concerto for violin, mandolin and orchestra or chamber orchestra "Would You Just As Soon Sing As Make That Noise?!" (1983)
Leoš Janáček
Violin Concerto "Pilgrimage of a Soul" (1927)
Joseph Joachim
Violin Concerto No. 1 in G minor, Op. 3 (1851), in one movement, dedicated to Franz Liszt
Violin Concerto No. 2 in D minor "in the Hungarian manner", Op. 11 (1861)
Violin Concerto No. 3 in G major, WoO (1875)
David Johnstone
The Four Seasons, for Violin solo and string orchestra (pub. 2008)
Rhapsody Concertante (on Hungarian and Rumanian themes) for Violin solo and string orchestra (pub. 2008)
Poema de amor, for Violin solo and string orchestra (pub.2007)
André Jolivet
Violin Concerto  (1972)

K
Dmitri Kabalevsky
Violin Concerto in C major, Op. 48 (1948)
Jan Kalivoda
One concerto, a fantasy and six concertinos for violin and orchestra
Romualds Kalsons
Violin Concerto (1978)
Mieczysław Karłowicz
Violin Concerto in A major, Op. 8 (1902)
Shigeru Kan-no
2 Violin Concertos
Talivaldis Kenins
Violin Concerto (1974)
Tristan Keuris
Violin Concerto No. 1 (1984)
Violin Concerto No. 2 (1995)
Aram Khachaturian
Violin Concerto in D minor, Op. 46 (1940)
Concerto-Rhapsody in B-flat minor, Op. 96 (1961)
Oliver Knussen
Violin Concerto, Op. 30 (2002)
Erich Wolfgang Korngold
Violin Concerto in D major, Op. 35 (1945)
Božidar Kos
Violin Concerto (1986)
Fritz Kreisler
Violin Concerto in C major "in the style of Vivaldi"
Franz Krommer
12 violin concertos (opp. 20, 41, 42, 43, 44, 61, 64, 81 and four without opus number—alternatively Padrta (P) III:1, 6–9, 13–15, C1, F1, F2 and G1)
Branimir Krstic
horses and dolphins unstuck in time (2008)
Hanna Kulenty
Violin Concerto No. 1 [version for chamber orchestra] [version for chamber orchestra](1992) [version for large orchestra] (1993)
Violin Concerto No. 2 (1996)

L
José White Lafitte
Violin Concerto in F-sharp minor (1864)
Édouard Lalo
Violin Concerto in F major, Op. 20 (1874)
Symphonie Espagnole
Concerto russe in G minor, Op. 29 (1879)
Lars-Erik Larsson
Violin Concerto, Op. 42 (1952)
Henri Lazarof
Concerto for Violin (1986)
Violin Concerto No. 3 'Edinger', (2003)
Jean-Marie Leclair
Six Violin Concertos, Op. 7, in D minor, D major, C major, F major, A minor, and A major
Six Violin Concertos, Op. 10, in B major, A major, D major, F major, E minor, and G major
Benjamin Lees
Violin Concerto (1958)
Ulrich Leyendecker
Violin Concerto (1995)
Lowell Liebermann
Concerto for Violin and Orchestra Op.74 (2001)
György Ligeti
Violin Concerto (1989–92)
Magnus Lindberg
Violin Concerto No. 1 (2006)
Violin Concerto No. 2 (2015)
Bo Linde
Concerto for Violin, Op. 18 (1957)
Karol Lipiński 1790 - 1861
I Violin Concerto F sharp minor op. 14
II Violin Concerto (militare) D major op. 21
III Violin Concerto E minor, op.24
IV Violin Concerto A major, op.32
Andrew List
Violin Concerto (2004)
George Lloyd
Concerto for violin and winds (1970)
Concerto for violin and strings (1977)
Mihovil Logar
Violin Concerto
Thomas Ludwig
Concerto for Violin and Orchestra (1989)
Witold Lutosławski
Chain II, dialogue for violin and orchestra (1984–85)
Partita, for violin and orchestra (1988)
Violin Concerto (1994) (fragments only)

M

Aleksi Machavariani
Concerto for violin and symphony orchestra (1949)
Otmar Mácha
Violin Concerto (1986)
James MacMillan
Violin Concerto (2009)
Bruno Maderna
Violin Concerto (1969)
Stuart MacRae
Violin Concerto (2001)
Gian Francesco Malipiero
 Violin Concerto No.1 (1932)
 Violin Concerto No.2 (1963)
Ljubica Marić
 Asymptote for violin and string orchestra (1986)
Tomás Marco
Violin Concerto (1971)
Concierto del alma for violin and string orchestra (1987)
Frank Martin
Violin Concerto (1950–51)
Polyptyque, Concerto for Violin and Double String Orchestra (1973)
Jean Martinon
Violin Concerto No. 2 (1958, rev. 1960)
Bohuslav Martinů
Violin Concerto No. 1 (1943)
Violin Concerto No. 2 (1944–45)
Concerto for Two Violins and Orchestra (1950)
Tauno Marttinen
Violin Concerto, Op. 13 (1962)
 Karl Marx
Concert for Two Violins and Orchestra
Nicholas Maw
Violin Concerto (1993)
George Frederick McKay
Concerto for Violin (1942)
Erkki Melartin
Concerto for Violin and Orchestra (1913)
Felix Mendelssohn
Violin Concerto in D minor (1822)
Violin Concerto in E minor, Op. 64 (1844)
Aarre Merikanto
Violin Concerto No. 2 (1925)
Edgar Meyer
Violin Concerto (1999)
Krzysztof Meyer
Violin Concerto No. 1 (1965)
Violin Concerto No. 2 (1996)
Ernst Hermann Meyer
Violin Concerto (1964)
Gian Carlo Menotti
Violin Concerto (1952)
Francisco Mignone
Violin Concerto (1960)
András Mihály
Violin Concerto (1961)
Darius Milhaud
Violin Concerto No. 1 (1927)
Violin Concertos No. 2 (1946)
Violin Concertos No. 3 (1958)
Emil Młynarski
Violin concerto in D minor, Op. 11 (ca. 1897)
Violin concerto in D major, Op. 16 (ca. 1916) 
Ernest John Moeran
Violin Concerto (1942)
Richard Mohaupt
Concerto for Violin and Orchestra (1945)
Moritz Moszkowski
Violin Concerto in C major, Op. 30 (1885)
Alexander Moyzes
Violin Concerto (1958)
Wolfgang Amadeus Mozart
Violin Concerto No. 1 in B-flat major, K. 207 (1773), with alternative Rondo in B, K.269/261a (added 1775-1777)
Violin Concerto No. 2 in D major, K. 211 (1775)
Violin Concerto No. 3 in G major, K. 216, Strassburg (1775)
Violin Concerto No. 4 in D major, K. 218 (1775)
Violin Concerto No. 5 in A major, K. 219, Turkish (1775) with alternative Adagio in E, K.261 (added 1776)
Violin Concerto No. 6 in E-flat major, K. 268 (Attributed to Johann Friedrich Eck, 1780–81)
Violin Concerto No. 7 in D major, K. 271a, Kolb (Doubtful, 1777)
Adélaïde Concerto (Forgery by Marius Casadesus, 1933)
Nikolai Myaskovsky
Violin Concerto in D minor, Op. 44 (1938)

N
Pietro Nardini
Violin Concerto in E Major
Carl Nielsen
Violin Concerto, Op. 33 (1911)
Serge Nigg
Violin Concerto No. 1 (1957)
Pehr Henrik Nordgren
Concerto for Violin No. 1 (1969)
Concerto for Violin No. 2, Op. 33 (1977)
Concerto for Violin No. 3, Op. 53 (1981)
Concerto for Violin No. 4, Op. 90, (1994)
Per Nørgård
Violin Concerto No. 1 'Helle Nacht' (1987)
Violin Concerto No. 2 'Borderlines' (2002)
Ib Nørholm
Violin Concerto (1975)

O
Aleksandar Obradović
Concerto for Violin and String Orchestra (1991)
Mark O'Connor
Fiddle Concerto (1993)
Double Violin Concerto (1997)
Claus Ogerman
Violin Concerto (1982)
Hiroshi Ohguri 
Violin Concerto (1963)
Slavko Osterc
Concerto for Violin and 7 Instruments (1928)

P
Niccolò Paganini
Violin Concerto No. 1 in D major, Op. 6, MS 21 (ca. 1811–17)
Violin Concerto No. 2 in B minor, Op. 7, MS 48, La Campanella (1826)
Violin Concerto No. 3 in E major, MS 50 (ca. 1826–30)
Violin Concerto No. 4 in D minor, MS 60 (ca. 1829–30)
Violin Concerto No. 5 in A minor, MS 78 (1830)
Violin Concerto No. 6 in E minor, Op. posth., MS 75—probably the first to be written; only the solo part survives
Andrzej Panufnik
Violin Concerto (1971)
Boris Papandopulo
Violin Concerto (1943)
Arvo Pärt
Tabula Rasa—Double Concerto for two violins, string orchestra, and prepared piano (1977)
Helmers Pavasars
Violin Concerto
Krzysztof Penderecki
Violin Concerto No. 1 (1977)
Violin Concerto No. 2 'Metamorphosen' (1992–93)
Giovanni Battista Pergolesi
Violin Concerto in B flat major
Wilhelm Peterson-Berger
Violin Concerto (1928)
Allan Pettersson
Violin Concerto No. 1 (for violin and string quartet) (1949)
Violin Concerto No. 2 (1977–78, rev. 1980)
Hans Pfitzner
Violin Concerto in B minor, Op. 34 (1923)
Willem Pijper
Violin Concerto (1938–39)
Walter Piston
Violin Concerto No. 1 (1939)
Violin Concerto No. 2 (1960)
Ildebrando Pizzetti
Violin Concerto (1944)
Manuel Maria Ponce
Violin Concerto (1943)
Gundaris Pone
Violin Concerto (1959)
André Previn
Violin Concerto "Anne-Sophie" (2001)
Sergei Prokofiev
Violin Concerto No. 1 in D major, Op. 19 (1917)
Violin Concerto No. 2 in G minor, Op. 63 (1935)

R
Luis Felipe Ramírez Santillán
Violin Concerto and solo voices, (2017-18)
Nikolai Rakov
Violin Concerto No.1 E minor (1944)
Violin Concerto No.2 A minor (1954)
Einojuhani Rautavaara
Violin Concerto (1976–77)
Alan Rawsthorne
Concerto for Violin No. 1 (1948)
Concerto for Violin No. 2 (1956)
Max Reger
Violin Concerto in A major, Op. 101 (1907–08)
Carl Reinecke
Violin Concerto in G minor, Op. 141 (1876)
Ottorino Respighi
Violin Concerto in A major (1903, unfinished)
Concerto gregoriano (1921)
Ferdinand Ries
Violin Concerto in E minor, Op. 24 (1810)
Wolfgang Rihm
Violin Concerto, Op. 14 (1991–92)
Knudåge Riisager
Violin Concerto in a minor, Op. 54 (1950-51)
Milan Ristić
Violin Concerto (1944)
George Rochberg
Violin Concerto (1974, rev. 2001)
Pierre Rode
Thirteen violin concertos
Joaquín Rodrigo
Concierto de estío (1944)
Alessandro Rolla
49 Works for violin and orchestra, including 21 concertos, and 28 shorter works
2 Concertos for 2 violins
Julius Röntgen
Violin Concerto in A minor (1902)
Violin Concerto in D major (1925/26)
Violin Concerto in F-sharp minor (1931)
Amanda Röntgen-Maier
Violin Concerto in D minor in one movement (1875)
Ned Rorem
Violin Concerto (1984)
Hilding Rosenberg
Violin Concerto No. 1 (1924)
Violin Concerto No. 2 (1951)
Nikolai Roslavets
Violin Concerto (1925)
Christopher Rouse
Violin Concerto (1991)
Miklós Rózsa
Violin Concerto, Op. 24 (1956)
Ludomir Różycki
Violin Concerto (1944)
Edmund Rubbra
Violin Concerto, Op. 103 (1959)
Anton Rubinstein
Violin Concerto in G major, Op. 46
Poul Ruders
Violin Concerto No. 1 (1981)
Violin Concerto No. 2 (1991–92)

S
P. Peter Sacco
Concerto for Violin No. 1 (1969)
Harald Sæverud
Violin Concerto Op.37 (1957)
Chevalier de Saint-Georges
About twenty-five violin concertos
Camille Saint-Saëns
Violin Concerto No. 1 in A major, Op. 20 (1859)
Violin Concerto No. 2 in C major, Op. 58 (1858)
Violin Concerto No. 3 in B minor, Op. 61 (1880)
Prosper Sainton
Concerto no. 1, Op. 9 (ca 1851)
Aulis Sallinen
Violin Concerto, Op. 18 (1968)
Ignacio Salvo
Double Violin Concerto (2014–15)
Ahmet Adnan Saygun
Violin Concerto (1967)
Alfred Schnittke
Violin Concerto No. 1 (1957, rev. 1966)
Violin Concerto No. 2 (1966)
Violin Concerto No. 3 (1978)
Violin Concerto No. 4 (1984)
Othmar Schoeck
Violin Concerto in B-flat major, Opus 21 (1912)
Arnold Schoenberg
Violin Concerto (1936)
Gunther Schuller
Concerto for Violin No. 1 (1976)
Concerto for Violin No. 2 (1991)
William Schuman
Violin Concerto (1947, rev. 1956 & 1959)
Robert Schumann
Violin Concerto in D minor (1853)
Ernest Schuyten
Violin Concerto (1930s)
Laura Schwendinger
 Chiaroscuro Azzurro (2007)
Cyril Scott
Violin Concerto
Tibor Serly
Concerto for Violin and Wind Symphony (1958–59)
Roger Sessions
Violin Concerto in B minor (1935)
Zdeněk Šesták
Violin concerto Sursum corda (1981) (wind, harp, celesta, gong and kettledrums accompaniment) (Zdenek Sestak - Czech Contemporary Composer)
Tolib Shahidi
Concerto for Violin and Chamber Orchestra (1993)
Rodion Shchedrin
Concerto Cantabile (1998)
Vissorion Shebalin
Violin Concerto, Op. 21 (1936–40, 1959)
Noam Sheriff
Violin Concerto (1986)
Dmitri Shostakovich
Violin Concerto No. 1 in A minor, Op. 77 (1948, rev. 1955 as Op. 99)
Violin Concerto No. 2 in C-sharp minor, Op. 129 (1967)
Aleksandr Shymko
Violin concerto (2012)
Jean Sibelius
Violin Concerto in D minor, Op. 47 (1904)
Robert Simpson
Violin Concerto (1959) (withdrawn)
Christian Sinding
Violin Concerto No. 1 in A major, Op. 45 (1898)
Violin Concerto No. 2 in D major, Op. 60 (published by 1901)
Violin Concerto No. 3, Op. 119 (1917)
Maddalena Laura Sirmen
Six Violin Concerti
Nikos Skalkottas
Violin Concerto (1938)
Lucijan Marija Škerjanc
Violin Concerto (1944)
Dane Škerl
Violin Concerto (1984)
Yngve Sköld
Violin Concerto (1941)
Myroslav Skoryk
Violin Concerto (1971)
David Stanley Smith
Violin Concerto No. 1 in F major, opus 69 (before 1934)
Violin Concerto No. 2 in G major, opus 86 (before 1943)
Arthur Somervell
Violin Concerto in G minor (1930)
Vladimír Sommer
Violin Concerto (1950)
Leo Sowerby
Violin Concerto in G major (1913, rev. 1924)
Louis Spohr
15 violin concertos and other works for violin and orchestra
Charles Villiers Stanford
Violin Concerto in D major, Opus 74 (1899)
Violin Concerto in G minor, Opus 162 (1918)
Robert Starer
Violin Concerto (1979–80)
Ronald Stevenson
Violin Concerto "The Gypsy" (1977–79)
Josip Štolcer-Slavenski
Violin Concerto (1927)
Oscar Strasnoy
"Automaton", for solo violin and chamber orchestra (2016)
Richard Strauss
Violin Concerto (1881–82)
Igor Stravinsky
Violin Concerto (1931)
Stjepan Šulek
Violin Concerto (1951)
Hermann Suter
Violin Concerto (1924)
Margaret Sutherland
Violin Concerto (1954)
Johann Severin Svendsen
Violin Concerto Op.6 (1868–70)
Tomáš Svoboda
Violin Concerto, Op. 77 (1975)
Karol Szymanowski
Violin Concerto No. 1, Op. 35 (1916)
Violin Concerto No. 2, Op. 61 (1933)

T
Otar Taktakishvili
Violin Concerto No. 2 (1987)
Eino Tamberg
Violin Concerto (1981)
Bernard Tan
Violin Concerto (2005)
Giuseppe Tartini
Over 130 violin concertos (Istria on the Internet - Prominent Istrians - Giuseppe Tartini)
Alexander Tchaikovsky
Violin Concerto (1987)
Pyotr Ilyich Tchaikovsky
Violin Concerto in D major, Op. 35 (1878)
Georg Philipp Telemann
Violin Concerto in A Major "Die Relinge" TWV 51:A4
Violin Concerto in B major ("Concerto grosso, per il Sigr. Pisendel") TWV 51:B1
Concerto for Two Violins and Strings in C major TWV52:C2
Concerto for Two Violins and Strings in D major TWV52:D3
Concerto for Two Violins and Strings in E minor TWV52:e4
Concerto for Two Violins and Strings in G major TWV52:G2
Concerto for Two Violins and Strings in G minor TWV52:g1
Concerto for Two Violins and Strings in A major TWV52:A2
Concerto for Two Violins and Strings in B major TWV52:B2
Concerto for Three Violins in F major, TWV 53:F1
Concerto for Four Violins in A major, 54:A 1
Alicia Terzian
Concerto for Violin and Orchestra Op. 7 in D Minor (1956)
Augusta Read Thomas
Spirit Musings—Concerto for violin and orchestra (1997)
Cello Concerto No. 2—Ritual Incantations (1999)
Violin Concerto No. 3—Juggler in Paradise (2008)
Leifur Þórarinsson
Violin Concerto (1969–70)
Boris Tishchenko
Violin Concerto No. 2
Violin Concerto (2011)
Joan Tower
Violin Concerto (1992)
Vitomir Trifunović
Violin Concerto (1976)
Eduard Tubin
Violin Concerto No. 1 (1941–42)
Violin Concerto No. 2 (1945)

V
Fartein Valen
Violin Concerto (1940)
Nancy Van de Vate
Violin concerto No.1 (1986)
David Van Vactor
Violin Concerto (1951)
Pēteris Vasks
Violin Concerto 'Distant Light' (1996–97)
Ralph Vaughan Williams
Violin Concerto in D minor, "Concerto Accademico"
Carlos Veerhoff
Violin Concerto No.1 op.40 (1976)
Violin Concerto No.2 op.69 (1992)
Joseph Vella
Violin Concerto (1993)
Francesco Maria Veracini
Concerto a cinque in A major, for violin, strings, and continuo
Concerto a cinque in D major, for violin, strings, and continuo
Concerto a otto strumenti in D major, for violin solo, two trumpets, two oboes, strings, and continuo (1711)
Henri Vieuxtemps
Violin Concerto No. 1 in E major, Op. 10 (1840)
Violin Concerto No. 2 in F-sharp minor, Op. 19 (ca. 1835–36)
Violin Concerto No. 3 in A major, Op. 25 (1844)
Violin Concerto No. 4 in D minor, Op. 31 (ca. 1850)
Violin Concerto No. 5 in A minor, Op. 37, Grétry (1861)
Violin Concerto No. 6 in G major, Op. 47/Op. posth. 1  (1865–1870)
Violin Concerto No. 7 in A minor, Op. 49/Op. posth. 3
Giovanni Battista Viotti—twenty-nine violin concertos, particularly:
Violin Concerto No. 22 in A minor (1792)
Antonio Vivaldi—many, particularly:
L'estro armonico, Op. 3 (1711)—twelve concertos
The Four Seasons (ca. 1725) —four concertos, the first four numbers of Il cimento dell'armonia e dell'inventione, Op. 8
Concerto in D major "Grosso Mogul", RV 208 
Pancho Vladigerov
Violin Concerto No. 1 (1921)
Wladimir Vogel
Violin Concerto (1937)
Pavel Vranický
Violin Concertos in C, D, F and G

W
William Walton
Violin Concerto (1939)
Robert Ward
Concerto for violin and orchestra (1993, revised 1994)
Kurt Weill
Concerto for Violin and Wind Orchestra, Op.12 (1924)
Mieczysław Weinberg
Violin Concerto, Op. 67 (1959)
Egon Wellesz
Violin Concerto, Op. 84 (1961)
Richard Wetz
Violin Concerto in B minor, Op. 57 (1933) 
Jörg Widmann
Violin Concerto (2007)
Violin Concerto No. 2 (2018)
Henryk Wieniawski
Violin Concerto No. 1 in F-sharp minor, Op. 14 (1853)
Violin Concerto No. 2 in D minor, Op. 22 (1862)
John Williams
Violin Concerto No. 1 (1974–76, rev. 1998)
Violin Concerto No. 2 (2021)
Richard Edward Wilson
Concerto for Violin and Chamber Orchestra (1979)
Hugh Wood
Violin Concerto No. 1, Op. 17 (1970–72)
Violin Concerto No. 2, Op. 50 (2003–2004)
John Woolrich
Violin Concerto (2008)
Charles Wuorinen
Concerto for violin and orchestra (1958)
Concerto for amplified violin and orchestra (1972)

Y
Chen Yi
Violin concerto "Spring in Dresden" (2005)

Z
Riccardo Zandonai
Concerto romantico for violin and orchestra
Hermann Zilcher
Concerto No. 1 in B minor for violin and small orchestra, Op. 11
Violin Concerto No. 2 in A major, Op. 92 (1942)
Concerto for 2 violins and orchestra in D minor, Op. 9
Bernd Alois Zimmermann
Violin Concerto (1950)
Ellen Taaffe Zwilich
Violin Concerto No. 1 (1997)
Partita (Concerto No. 2) for violin and string orchestra (2000)
Commedia dell'Arte (Violin Concerto No. 3) for violin and string orchestra (2012)

Other concertante works for violin and orchestra
Gilbert Amy
Trajectoires, for violin and orchestra (1966)
Louis Andriessen
La Girò, for violin and ensemble (2011)
Béla Bartók
One Ideal, Op. 5/1 (1907–10)
One Grotesque, Op. 5/2 (1907–10)
Rhapsody No. 1 (1928)
Rhapsody No. 2 (1928)
Ludwig van Beethoven
Romance No. 1 in G major, Op. 40 (1798–1802)
Romance No. 2 in F major, Op. 50 (1798–1802)
Luciano Berio
Corale for violin, two horns, and strings (1981)
Hector Berlioz
Reverie et Caprice, Op.8 (1841)
Leonard Bernstein
Serenade after Plato's "Symposium"(1954)
Nimrod Borenstein
"Poème" for violon solo and string orchestra Op. 64 (2013)
Max Bruch
Romance in A minor, Op. 42 (1874)
Scottish Fantasy in E-flat major, Op. 46 (1880)
Adagio Appassionato in C-sharp minor, Op. 57 (1890)
Schwedische Tanze, Op. 63/2 (1892)
In memoriam, Op. 65 (1893)
Serenade in A minor, Op. 75 (1899–1900)
Konzertstück in F-sharp minor, Op. 84 (ca. 1911)
Ernest Chausson
Poème, Op. 25 (1896)
Chen Yi
Chinese Folk Dance Suite for Violin and Orchestra (2000)
Romance and Dance for 2 Violins and String Orchestra (1995/1998)
Henry Cowell
Air, HC 767/1a (1952)
Fiddler's Jig, HC 771, Flirtatious Jig (1952)
César Cui
 Suite concertante, Op. 25 (1884)
Luigi Dallapiccola
Tartiniana (1951)
Tartiniana seconda (1955–56)
Frederick Delius
Suite for violin and orchestra (1888)
Légende (1895)
Alphons Diepenbrock
Hymne (1917)
Antonín Dvořák
Romance in F minor, Op. 11 (1877)
Mazurek, Op. 49 (1879)
George Enescu
Ballade, for violin and orchestra (1895)
Caprice Roumain, for violin and orchestra (1928, unfinished; completed by )
Jacobo Ficher
Three Pieces for violin and orchestra, Op. 65 (1948)
Philip Glass
Echorus for two violins and string orchestra (1995)
Alexander Glazunov
Mazurka-Oberek in D major, Op. 100b (1917)
Lou Harrison
Koncherto for violin and percussion ensemble (1959)
Music for Violin and Various Instruments, European, Asian, and African (1967–69)
Suite for Violin and American Gamelan (1974; arr. for violin and string orchestra, 1993)
Philemon and Baukis for violin and Javanese gamelan (1985–87)
Hamilton Harty
Variations on a Dublin Air, for violin and orchestra (1912)
Victor Herbert
Fantasia on Cavalleria rusticana (Mascagni) for violin and orchestra (1893)
Ferdinand Hiller
Violin Concerto/Fantasiestück Opus 152 (published by Forberg, 1870s, before 1876) (Koninklijke Bibliotheek of the Hague, University of Rochester Voyager Catalog  which notes that it is dedicated to Eugène Ysaÿe)
Paul Hindemith
Kammermusik No. 4 (Violin Concerto), Op. 36, No. 3 (1925)
Robin Holloway
Romanza for violin and small orchestra, Op. 31 (1976)
Alan Hovhaness
Ode to Freedom for violin and orchestra, Op. 284
Joseph Joachim
Notturno in A major, Op. 12 (1858)
Andantino in A minor
Variations in E minor 
Aaron Jay Kernis
Air (1996; orig. for violin and piano, 1995)
Lament and Prayer (1996)
Édouard Lalo
Symphonie Espagnole, Op. 21 (1874)
André Laporte
Fantasia-Rondino con tema reale, for violin and orchestra (1988)
Witold Lutosławski
Chain II (1984–85)
Partita for Violin and Orchestra (1988; orig. for violin and piano, 1984)
Alexander Mackenzie
Pibroch Suite, Op. 42 (version for violin and orchestra) (premiered 1889, ded. Sarasate)
Otto Malling
Concert Fantasy (first perf. 1884)
Tomás Marco
Les mécanismes de la mémoire, for violin and orchestra (1973)
Bohuslav Martinů
Duo Concertant for Two Violins and Orchestra (1937)
Jules Massenet
Meditation from Thaïs (1894) (often programmed as a standalone piece)
John Blackwood McEwen
Scottish Fantasy "Prince Charlie" (1941 orchestration of a 1915 violin and piano work)
Fred Momotenko
To the Silence, for string orchestra (2015)
Wolfgang Amadeus Mozart
Concertone in C major, for two violins and orchestra, K. 190 (1774)
Rondo in B-flat major, K. 269/261a (1775-1777)
Adagio in E major, K. 261 (1776)
Rondo in C major, K. 373 (1781)
Oskar Nedbal
2 pieces, Op.6 (1893)
I. Romance
II. Serenade
Arvo Pärt
Fratres for violin, string orchestra, and percussion (1992) 
Darf ich... for violin, bells, and string orchestra (1995/1999)
Walter Piston
Fantasia (1970)
Nikolai Rakov
Concertino in D minor for violin and string orchestra (1960)
Maurice Ravel
Tzigane (1924)
Steve Reich
Duet for Two Violins and String Orchestra (1993)
Wolfgang Rihm
Coll'arco
Gesungene Zeit
Lichtes Spiel
Nikolai Rimsky-Korsakov
Fantasy on Two Russian Themes, for violin and orchestra, Op. 33, 1886–87
Mazurka on [Three] Polish Folk Themes, for violin and orchestra, 1888; also called Souvenir de trois chants polonais
Julius Röntgen
Suite D minor for Violin and Strings (1892)
Ballade (1918)
Camille Saint-Saëns
Introduction and Rondo Capriccioso in A minor, Op. 28 (1863)
Romance in C major, Op. 48 (1874)
Morceau de concert in G major, Op. 62 (1880)
Havanaise in E major, Op. 83 (1887)
Caprice andalous in G major, Op. 122 (1904)
Pablo de Sarasate
Zigeunerweisen, Op. 20 (1878)
Carmen Fantasy, Op. 25 (1883)
Navarra for two violins and orchestra, Op. 33 (1889)
Miramar-Zortzico, Op. 42 (1899)
Introduction and Tarantella, Op. 43 (1899)
Giacinto Scelsi
Anahit (1965)
R. Murray Schafer
The Darkly Splendid Earth (1991)
Alfred Schnittke
Sonata for Violin and Chamber Orchestra (1968; orig. for violin and piano, 1963)
Quasi una sonata (1987)
Homage to Grieg (1993)
Franz Schubert
Konzertstück in D major, D. 345 (1816)
Rondo in A major, D. 438 (1816)
Polonaise in B-flat major, D. 580 (1817)
Robert Schumann
Fantasy in C major, Op. 131 (1853)
Raminta Šerkšnytė
Vortex (2004)
John Sharpley
Fantasy for Violin and Orchestra "Greeting Card" (1999)
Jean Sibelius
2 serenades, Op.69 (1913)
I. Andante assai in D major
II. Lento assai in G minor
6 Humoresques (1917)
I. Humoresque in D minor, Op.87, No.1
II. Humoresque in D major, Op.87, No.2
III. Humoresque in G minor, Op.89, No.1
IV. Humoresque in G minor, Op.89, No.2
V. Humoresque in E-flat major, Op.89, No.3
VI. Humoresque in G minor, Op.89, No.4
Suite, Op.117 (1929)
I. Country scenery
II. Evening in Spring
III. In the Summer
Christian Sinding
Suite in A minor, Op. 10, Suite in the Old Style (1889)
Romance in D major, Op. 100 (1910)
Josef Suk
Fantasy in G minor (1902)
Johan Svendsen
Romance Op. 26 (1881)
Tan Dun
Out of Peking Opera (1987, rev. 1994)
Sergei Taneyev
Concert Suite for Violin and Orchestra, Op. 28 (1909)
Pyotr Ilyich Tchaikovsky
Sérénade mélancolique, Op.26 (1875)
Valse-Scherzo, Op.34 (1878)
Souvenir d'un lieu cher, Op. 42 (1878) (Orchestration: Glazunov)
 Méditation (D minor)
 Scherzo (C minor)
 Mélodie: chant sans paroles (E-flat major)
Ralph Vaughan Williams
The Lark Ascending (1914)
Heitor Villa-Lobos
Fantasia de movimentos mistos for violin and orchestra (1921)
O martírio dos insetos for violin and orchestra (1925)
Henryk Wieniawski
Légende in G minor, Op. 17 (1859)
Fantasia on Themes from Gounod's 'Faust', Op.20
John Williams
TreeSong (2000) 
John Woolrich
Capriccio (2009)
Charles Wuorinen
Concertante II for violin and chamber orchestra (1958)
Rhapsody for violin and orchestra (1983)
Iannis Xenakis
Dox-Orkh (1991)
Aleksander Zarzycki
Andante et polonaise in A major for violin and orchestra, Op. 23
Introduction et cracovienne in D major for violin and orchestra, Op. 35
Hermann Zilcher
Klage, Konzertstück in F minor for violin and small orchestra, Op. 22 (1908)
Skizzen aus dem Orient for violin and chamber orchestra, Op. 18 (1906)
Ellen Taafe Zwilich
Romance for violin and chamber orchestra (1993)

Works for orchestra or large ensemble with prominent solo violin part
Wolfgang Amadeus Mozart
Serenade for orchestra in D major, K. 250 ("Haffner") (1776)
Nikolai Rimsky-Korsakov
Scheherazade, Op. 35 (1888)
Capriccio Espagnol, Op. 34 (1887)
Charles Villiers Stanford
Irish Rhapsody No. 6 in D minor, Op. 191
Richard Strauss
Also sprach Zarathustra, Op. 30 (1896)
Don Quixote, Op. 35 (1897)
Ein Heldenleben, Op. 40 (1899)

Concertos for violin and other solo instrument(s)
Henk Badings
Concerto for violin, viola and orchestra (1965)
Osvaldas Balakauskas
Sinfonia Concertante, for violin and piano (1982)
Giovanni Bottesini
Gran duo Concertante, for violin and double-bass
Ludwig van Beethoven
Triple Concerto in C major, Op. 56, for piano, violin, and cello (1804–5)
Johannes Brahms
Double Concerto in A minor, Op. 102, for violin and cello
Peter Maxwell Davies
Strathclyde Concerto No. 5, for violin, viola and string orchestra (1991)
Frederick Delius
Double Concerto for violin and cello (1916)
Joseph Haydn
Concerto in F major, Hob. XVIII/6, for piano, violin, and strings (before 1766)
Alan Hovhaness
Concerto for violin, sitar, and orchestra, Op. 228
Johann Nepomuk Hummel
Double Concerto in G major, Op. 17, for piano and violin
Julius Juzeliūnas
Concerto for Violin and Organ (1963)
Ernst Krenek
Concerto for Violin and Piano, Op. 124
Bohuslav Martinů
Concerto for Violin and Piano (1953)
Felix Mendelssohn
Concerto in D minor, for violin and piano
Francisco Mignone
Double concerto for violin and piano (1966)
Wolfgang Amadeus Mozart
Sinfonia Concertante for Violin, Viola and Orchestra
Sinfonia Concertante for Violin, Viola, Cello and Orchestra (fragment)
Sinfonia Concertante for Piano, Violin and Orchestra (fragment)
Julius Röntgen
Triple concerto in B-flat major, for violin, viola, cello and strings (1922)
Double Concerto for violin and cello (1927)
Triple concerto for violin, viola and cello (1930)
Introduktion, Fuge, Intermezzo und Finale for violin, viola, cello
Dame Ethel Smyth
Concerto in A Major for Violin, French horn and Orchestra (1927)
Alexander Tchaikovsky
Concerto for Violin, Viola and orchestra (1988)
Anatol Vieru
Concerto for violin, cello, and orchestra (1979)
Robert Ward
Dialogues, a Triple Concerto for violin, cello, piano and orchestra (1986–2002)
Mark Wessel
Ballade, for solo violin, solo oboe, and string orchestra (1931)
Ellen Taafe Zwilich
Concerto for violin, cello and orchestra (1991)

See also
 String instrument repertoire
 List of double concertos for violin and cello
 List of triple concertos for violin, cello, and piano
 List of compositions for two violins

Notes

  
 
Violin and orchestra compositions
Violin and orchestra compositions